Alfonso Boschi (1615–1649) was an Italian painter of the Baroque period, active mainly in Florence. He was a pupil of his brother Francesco Boschi.

References
ULAN entry from Getty museum .

1615 births
1649 deaths
17th-century Italian painters
Italian male painters
Painters from Florence
Italian Baroque painters